Rick Deckard is a fictional character and the protagonist of Philip K. Dick's 1968 novel Do Androids Dream of Electric Sheep?. Harrison Ford portrayed the character in the 1982 film adaptation, Blade Runner, and reprised his role in the 2017 sequel, Blade Runner 2049. James Purefoy voiced the character in the 2014 BBC Radio 4 adaptation.

Original novel 
Rick Deckard is a bounty hunter who becomes a specialist plainclothes police officer with the San Francisco Police Department in the early 21st century, responsible for killing androids that escape from off-world colonies. He begins the story as a selfish, self-involved cop who seemingly sees no value in android life, but his experiences cause him to develop empathy toward androids and all living things.

Deckard is married to Iran, one of the more empathetic characters in the novel. She descends into a depression over the state of humanity, and is able to find the empathy necessary to care for an electric toad at the end of the novel.

Adaptation

Blade Runner
Harrison Ford portrayed Deckard in the 1982 film.  In the film, the bounty hunters are replaced by special police personnel called "Blade Runners", and the androids are called "replicants", terms not used in the original novel. The novel depicts Deckard as an obsequious and officious underling who is human and has a wife, but because of the many versions of the film and because of script, the backstory of the movie version of Rick Deckard becomes unclear. Viewers have to make up their own minds as to whether Deckard is a human or replicant and therefore has a past. The voice-over in the theatrical release indicates Deckard is divorced, as it mentions an ex-wife. However the voice-over has been removed from subsequent versions and so this detail is not mentioned. If the viewer takes the perspective that Deckard is a replicant then the "ex-wife" only becomes an implanted memory.

Blade Runner 2049
Ford reprised the role for the sequel, portraying an older Deckard who is hiding in the radioactive ruins of Las Vegas, violently resisting intrusion. Prior to the events of the film, Deckard's replicant lover Rachael became pregnant with his child but died in childbirth. Deckard was forced to leave the child, a girl, with a replicant freedom movement and scrambled the child's birth records to protect her before disappearing. The pursuit of the child by different groups is the main driving force of the plot. At the end of the film, Deckard finally meets his daughter Ana Stelline, a scientist who designs memories for replicants.

Analysis 
According to M. Blake Wilson, Deckard, the most famous of Dick's criminal justice professionals, is "one of the most humanized human cops in literature", showing a wide range of emotions and empathy, something that was further explored in the movie sequel (Blade Runner 2049) through the character of K.

Deckard: human or replicant?

References 

Blade Runner (franchise)
Characters in American novels of the 20th century
Characters in written science fiction
Fictional bounty hunters
Fictional characters from Los Angeles
Fictional characters from San Francisco
Literary characters introduced in 1968
Fictional San Francisco Police Department detectives
Fictional Los Angeles Police Department detectives
Fictional hermits
Science fiction film characters